The Judith River Group is a group of geologic formations in western North America dating from the late Cretaceous and noted as a site for the extensive excavation of dinosaur fossils. The formation is named after the Judith River in Montana. The group is also called the Judith River Wedge. It is stratigraphically equivalent with the Belly River Group in Alberta.

It comprises the Judith River Formation in north central Montana, as well as the Foremost, Oldman, and Dinosaur Park formations in Alberta and Saskatchewan in Canada. Within Canada, the name term Belly River Group is more widely used for what is essentially the same stratigraphic interval as the Judith River.  The wedge is exposed discontinuously in river drainages.

External links

Geologic groups of Montana
Stratigraphy of Alberta
Stratigraphy of Saskatchewan